The Sylvan Debating Club is a free speech society in which topical issues are discussed.  Founded in London in 1868, it meets monthly and employs a traditional motion-based debating format.

History 

The Sylvan Debating Club was founded in 1868.  More specifically, the inception of the club was discussed on top of one of the Green Atlas buses, which ran from the City of London through Baker Street and the Abbey Road to the Princess of Wales Hotel in St. John's Wood.  A conversation took place between Alfred Harmsworth and one of the other founders and resulted in the first meeting being held on 6 January 1868.

The club, particularly in its early years, included a number of prominent members.  This was partly driven by the Harmsworth family, who owned several leading newspapers.  Ultimately three of Alfred Harmsworth's sons were raised to the peerage, all of whom became members of the club.  Their associates and those of the other founders ensured that the club enjoyed the presence of illustrious members of British society well into the early decades of the twentieth century.

Operating in such a milieu meant that the activities of the Sylvans were reflected in major British newspaper reports at the time, particularly in coverage of the club's annual dinner, which was something of a set-piece event.  In 1901, the Duke of Norfolk was the principal guest.   In 1906, Charles Darling, a judge and future Privy Council member, was a guest.  Lord Carson, a former cabinet member and leader of the opposition in the government of the United Kingdom, was the principal guest at the dinner in 1927.

Over the years the Sylvans discussed topics such as the probity of the British press, the clarity of language used in British legal courts, the past and future of the club itself, the relationship between members of Parliament and newspaper editors, the oratory style of the House of Commons, the merits of public schools, vegetarianism and whether bachelors should be taxed among many others.

While it is ironically debatable whether such clubs had any impact whatsoever on the course of history, there are some statements recorded in the newspaper reports providing relevant indications.  During his speech at the 1901 Sylvan dinner, the Duke of Norfolk commented, according to the London Evening Standard, that "he thought that such clubs as the Sylvan Debating Club really did an important part in carrying on the public life of England, and the writing of the history of the great nation to which they belonged."

The club continued its activities through both the first and second World Wars, though the frequency of meetings reduced significantly, according to minute books recorded by the club's secretary.  The customary schedule had been weekly debates October through to April, with breaks over Christmas and Easter, with a program of topics announced in advance via printed cards.

Membership in debating societies in London in general waxed and waned due to various factors, post an initial flourishing in the mid eighteenth century.  By the mid twentieth century, few of these original clubs were still in existence. Those that were experienced a general decline in membership, in particular when major newspapers closed their Fleet Street offices.  The Sylvans continued uninterrupted during this period, though membership declined to a low point in the early 2000s, which has since been reversed.

Current activities 

The subject of the club's now monthly debates typically relates to key topical issues of public and political life.  Recent subjects have included Brexit, the NHS, the UK and US elections, the role of women in government, the war in Syria and many others.

The Sylvans debates are structured along the lines of the those held by the Oxford and Cambridge Unions and other debating societies.  There is a chairman who introduces the speakers and controls the debate generally.  The debate is focused on a particular motion.  This is proposed by the Proposer and opposed by the Opposer, following which all present are invited to contribute if they so wish, which are called "floor speeches".

Following rebuttals by the Proposer and the Opposer, the debate concludes with a vote, and the motion is thus declared to be either won or lost.  Members and guests are invited to play a role in selecting the motions, and to put themselves forward for the position of Proposer or Opposer.

Notable members 
 Alfred Harmsworth
 Viscount Northcliffe
 Viscount Rothermere
 Lord Cecil Harmsworth
 Sir Leicester Harmsworth, Bart.
 Sir Hildebrand Harmsworth, Bart
 St John Harmsworth
 Sir George Edward Dunstan Sherston Baker, Bart.
 Augustine Birrell
 John Seymour Lucas
 Daniel Grant
 Harwood Panting
 Kennedy Jones
 Baron Molloy
 Peter Hulme-Cross

See also 
 Society of Cogers

References

External links 
 Sylvan Debating Club website

Debating societies
Clubs and societies in London
1868 establishments in England
Organizations established in 1868